Alexandra Carter (born April 27, 1990) is a Canadian former voice actress who worked with Ocean Productions of Vancouver, British Columbia. Best known for her cute and nerdy characters, she was usually cast in the roles of very small boys or girls. Her last credited role was in 2012, doing a voice for the video game Sins of a Solar Empire: Rebellion. By 2013, if not earlier, she was working as a physician assistant.

Her roles include the angsty Aoi Housen of Infinite Ryvius, the geeky but sweet Sapphire from Trollz, Amara Aquilla/Magma from X-Men: Evolution, Princess Graciella from Barbie: A Fairy Secret, Rosy from Hamtaro, Nana from Meltylancer, Nicole Candler from Sabrina: Friends Forever, the maniacal Yagami from Maison Ikkoku, Paradice from Ōban Star-Racers, Momiji the Red Priestess from InuYasha, Kumomo from Mirmo!, and Twist from My Little Pony: Friendship Is Magic.

Carter was born in Alberta, and later moved to British Columbia. She graduated in 2005, as class valedictorian, from H.J. Cambie Secondary School in Richmond. Her sister, Adrienne Carter, also did live action and voice work, last credited for voice work in a 2015 episode of Dora and Friends: Into the City!.

References

External links
 
 
 

1987 births
Canadian voice actresses
Actresses from Alberta
Living people
Southern Virginia University alumni